Sir Mark Peter Rowley  (born November 1964) is a British senior police officer who has been the Commissioner of Police of the Metropolis since September 2022. 

He was the Assistant Commissioner of Police of the Metropolis for Specialist Operations of the Metropolitan Police Service and the concurrent Chair of the National Police Chiefs' Council Counter-Terrorism Coordination Committee and National Lead for Counter Terrorism Policing. He was previously Chief Constable of Surrey Police (2009–2011), and also served as Acting Deputy Commissioner of the Metropolitan Police between February 2017 and April 2017. He retired from the police in March 2018. 

In July 2022, it was announced that he would return to policing in the role of Commissioner of Police of the Metropolis, replacing former Commissioner Dame Cressida Dick.  He was sworn in as Commissioner on 12 September 2022.

Early life
Rowley was educated at Handsworth Grammar School, then an all boys state grammar school in Handsworth, Birmingham. In 1983, he matriculated into St Catharine's College, Cambridge. Having studied mathematics, he graduated with a Bachelor of Arts (BA) degree in 1986.

Career
In 1987, Rowley began his policing career when he joined West Midlands Police as a constable. His early career centred on Birmingham, where he undertook a broad range of both uniformed and detective roles.

He joined the National Criminal Intelligence Service as a Detective Superintendent. During his time serving in the NCIS, he led the development of covert operations to combat organised crime. In 2000, he joined Surrey Police as a senior officer when he was appointed Chief Superintendent in command of the West Surrey Basic Command Unit. Starting in 2002, he led the five-year investigation into the murder of Milly Dowler.

In November 2003, he was promoted to Assistant Chief Constable. His responsibilities originally included local policing, crime reduction and criminal justice, but in 2005 his role changed and he became responsible for major and organised crime. He was promoted to Deputy Chief Constable in 2007. He served as temporary Chief Constable of Surrey Police from March 2008. He was appointed Chief Constable of the force in March 2009. From 2009 to 2011, he was a member of the Association of Chief Police Officers Cabinet.

He reached the short list of four candidates to become head of the new National Crime Agency, but lost out to Keith Bristow. He joined the Metropolitan Police Service as Assistant Commissioner for Specialist Operations in October 2011.

In January 2018, Rowley announced he would retire from the police in March. He was succeeded by Neil Basu. 

In April 2022, he co-authored a counter-terrorism thriller, The Sleep of Reason, with journalist David Derbyshire.

Commissioner of the Metropolitan Police
On 8 July 2022, it was announced that Rowley would be the next Commissioner of the Metropolitan Police, in succession to Cressida Dick. He was sworn in on 12 September 2022.

Honours

Notelist

References

External links

|-

|-

|-

|-

|-

1964 births
Alumni of St Catharine's College, Cambridge
Assistant Commissioners of Police of the Metropolis
British Chief Constables
Commissioners of Police of the Metropolis
English recipients of the Queen's Police Medal
Knights Bachelor
Living people
People educated at Handsworth Grammar School